William Starr may refer to:
 William Starr (politician), American businessman, politician and abolitionist
 William Starr (violinist), American violinist
 William Beedham Starr, architect based in Nottingham, England
 Bill Starr, Major League Baseball catcher

See also
 Will Starr, Scottish accordionist